Egni Analia Almirón Eckert, simply known as Egni Eckert or Egny Eckert,  is a beauty queen contestant from Paraguay who represented her country in the Miss World 2010 pageant held in Sanya, China, placing among the Top 25 finalists.
Egni represented Paraguay in the Reina Hispanoamericana 2010 pageant where she won the Best Body award and Virreina Title (1st runner up).
In 2012 she entered the Miss Paraguay pageant for the second time, and won the Miss Universo Paraguay 2012 crown.  She represented Paraguay at the 2012 Miss Universe pageant.

References

External links
 Official Instagram Page

Living people
Miss World 2010 delegates
Miss Universe 2012 contestants
People from Luque
1987 births
Paraguayan beauty pageant winners
Paraguayan people of German descent
People from Asunción
Paraguayan female models